Operational artificial intelligence, or operational AI, is a type of intelligent system designed for real-world applications, particularly at commercial scale. The term is used to distinguish accessible artificially intelligent (AI) systems from fundamental AI research and from industrial AI applications which are not integrated with the routine usage of a business. The definition of operational AI differs throughout the IT industry, where vendors and individual organizations often create their own custom definitions of such processes and services for the purpose of marketing their own products. 

Applications include text analytics, advanced analytics, facial and image recognition, machine learning, and natural language generation.

Definitions
According to a white paper by software company Tupl Inc, continuous machine learning model training and results extraction in the telecom industry requires a large number of automation utilities in order to "facilitate the development and deployment of a multitude of use cases, the collection and correlation of the data, the creation and training of the models, and the operation at telecom-grade levels of security and availability".

Researchers in the University of Waterloo's Artificial Intelligence Group describe operational AI in terms of the focus on applications that bring value to products and company. University of Waterloo Professor of Electrical and Computer Engineering Fakhri Karray describes operational AI as "application of AI for the masses". Canada Research Chair and Associate Professor Alexander Wong (professor) describes operational AI as AI for "anyone, anywhere, anytime."

Related terms
Industrial AI refers to intelligent systems applied for business at any scale and for any use case.

See also
Applications of artificial intelligence
Edge computing
Industrial artificial intelligence
Continuous integration

References

Artificial intelligence